Kathar is a village development committee [recently included in Khairahani Municipality] in Chitwan District in the Narayani Zone of southern Nepal. At the time of the 2001 Nepal census it had a population of 8,247 people living in 1,326 individual households. About 60% of people were in agriculture and rest of them are in other. No any company are found. Tourist usually stay with families living in this village rather than at hotels.

References

Populated places in Chitwan District
Village development committees (Nepal)